This article includes two versions of the list of countries by crude mortality rate.

Methodology 
Crude mortality rate refers to the number of deaths over a given period divided by the person-years lived by the population over that period. It is usually expressed in units of deaths per 1,000 individuals per year.

The first list is based on the Organization for Economic Cooperation and Development (OECD) "2011 annual statistics". It contains the crude death rate of 236 countries and territories in 2011.

The second list is based on CIA World Factbook 2020 pre-Covid estimates.

Many developing countries have far higher proportions of young people, and lower proportions of older people, than some developed countries, and thus may have much higher age-specific mortality rates while having lower crude mortality rates.

Table

See also
List of countries by infant and under-five mortality rates

References

Lists of countries
Demographic lists
Death-related lists